Smooth Jazz Cafe is the seventh solo studio album by guitarist Brian Tarquin, released in October 2014 by Cleopatra Records/Purple Pyramid. The album was recorded at Tarquin's mobile Jungle Room Studios in the New York Catskill Mountains at a 200 year old Farmhouse. Additional recording was done in the quaint town of New Paltz (village), New York. Tarquin reached out to some old guitar friends to guest with him on the album, Chuck Loeb on Zoot Suit, Hal Lindes on The Big Sleep & Birdbrain, and Denny Jiosa on Hipster & Chrome Dome. The entire album was engineered, produced and performed by Tarquin. Most of the album is new material with exception of 4 songs, Peg, Swift Kick, Yorkville and Spanish Harlem.

Critical reception

Smooth Jazz Cafe received favorable reviews. John Heidt at Vintage Guitar (magazine) wrote "...harkens to Tarquin's days as a hitmaker working with acid-jazz producer Ernie McKone." Brent Black at Critical Jazz states "Six string aficionados will have plenty to cheer..." G.W. Hill of Music Street Journal stated "I think this is a great, and often exciting, jazz album."

Track listing

Personnel
Brian Tarquin – all guitars
Reggie Pryor – drums
Rick Mullen – bass
Julian Baker – piano and strings (track 11) 
Chuck Loeb - guitar (tracks 1-4)
Denny Jiosa - guitar (tracks 7 & 11)
Hal Lindes – guitar (track 5 & 9)
Frank Gambale – guitar (tracks 13)
Brian Tarquin – mix engineer, producer
David Glasser of Airshow – mastering engineer
Chris Landen at Audio Mechanics - mastering engineer
Miss M and Brian Tarquin – graphic design

References 

 
 
 

2014 albums
Cleopatra Records albums
Brian Tarquin albums